"She Loves Me Not" is the first single from rock band Papa Roach's third studio album, Lovehatetragedy, and fourth released single in total. Originally written as part of a five-track promo and demo CD funded by Warner Bros. Records in 1999, "She Loves Me Not" was re-recorded and improved for its new release in 2002. It was left off their first album, Infest (2000), because the band thought the song was too rock-oriented. The song appeared in the soundtrack for the game NHL 2003. The song is one of the few songs from Lovehatetragedy featuring Jacoby Shaddix rapping, a style that the band had less focus on the album.

Music video
The video for "She Loves Me Not" shows the band playing in a dilapidated theme park which people are using as a social gathering. The content is mostly performance based with cuts to people in the park who are vandalizing it, fighting, etc. It was directed by David Meyers.

At three points in the video, a person appears out of nowhere in front of the camera for a single frame, similar to methods used in subliminal messaging.

Track listing

Charts

References

Papa Roach songs
2002 singles
2002 songs
Songs written by Jacoby Shaddix
DreamWorks Records singles
Song recordings produced by Brendan O'Brien (record producer)
Music videos directed by Dave Meyers (director)